Porphyrosela desmodivora is a moth of the family Gracillariidae. It is found in western Cameroon.

The length of the forewings is 1.15–1.45 mm. The forewing ground colour is greyish ochreous, speckled with brownish, dark grey rectangular dots with three costal and three dorsal dirty white strigulae. The hindwings are brownish ochreous. Adults are on wing in late April.

The larvae feed on Desmodium adscendens.

Etymology
The specific epithet combines the generic name of the host plant and the Latin word vorare (meaning greedily eating) and refers to the ability of the larva to consume its host leaf quickly.

References

Endemic fauna of Cameroon
Moths described in 2012
Lithocolletinae
Insects of Cameroon
Moths of Africa

Taxa named by Jurate de Prins